No. 5 Fire Station in Sandusky, Ohio, was built in 1906.  It was listed on the National Register of Historic Places in 1982.

It was one of four fire stations built of cut limestone in Sandusky which held horse-drawn equipment.  It is a two-story building with a hipped gable roof.

See also 
 National Register of Historic Places listings in Erie County, Ohio
 Engine House No. 1 (Sandusky, Ohio)
 Engine House No. 3 (Sandusky, Ohio)

References

Fire stations on the National Register of Historic Places in Ohio
National Register of Historic Places in Erie County, Ohio
Fire stations completed in 1906
1906 establishments in Ohio
Buildings and structures in Sandusky, Ohio